Chang Ri-jin (born 28 October 1917) was a Korean basketball player. He competed at the 1936 Summer Olympics, representing Japan, and at the 1948 Summer Olympics, representing South Korea.

References

External links
 

1917 births
Possibly living people
Japanese men's basketball players
South Korean men's basketball players
Olympic basketball players of Japan
Olympic basketball players of South Korea
Basketball players at the 1936 Summer Olympics
Basketball players at the 1948 Summer Olympics
Basketball players at the 1954 Asian Games
Asian Games competitors for South Korea